An estimated 135,000 Australians live in Greece. Out of the community, at least 100,000 live in the city of Athens. The remaining are spread out throughout various parts of the country, especially in Thessaloniki. The Australian population in Greece is mostly Australians of Greek descent with dual citizenship. However, due to the economic crisis in Greece, many Australian citizens in the Hellenic country have returned Down Under.

Notable Australians in Greece

 George Johnston, journalist and writer (settled on the Greek island of Hydra)
 Charmian Clift, writer (settled on the Greek island of Hydra)

See also

 Greek Australians
 Australian-Greek relations
 Australian diaspora

References

 
Greece
Ethnic groups in Greece
Immigration to Greece